Melvin H. Ribble (January 11, 1870 – May 3, 1964) was an American cornetist, baritone hornist, and prolific composer and arranger of concert band music.

Career 
In 1889 Ribble, moved from his hometown, Clarinda, Iowa, to Lincoln, Nebraska, to play cornet with the Ashman Band. In 1898, he moved to Chicago, Illinois, where he obtained work as a staff arranger with Harry L. Alford's music publishing company. He worked writing custom arrangements. While in Chicago, Ribble composed and arranged for the Victor Music Co., later Rubank.  Victor was a small predecessor to Rubank. Ribble moved back to Lincoln in 1931 and established his own arranging business.  During this time, Ribble did many arrangements for Billy Quick, who directed the University of Nebraska

band for many years.

Selected works 
Compositions
 "The World Holds But One For Me," lyrics by Lora Evelyn Slater, music by Ribble, arranged by Carlton Lee Colby (1881–1937) (M.H. Ribble Co. ©1913)
 "Lovers' Lane," lyrics & music by Ribble, arranged by Carlton Lee Colby (1881–1937) (M.H. Ribble Co. ©1913)
 "Lizella Overture" (Fillmore Bros./Rubank ©1912) 
 "Song of the Bull Moose" (Victor ©1919)   
 "Night's Enchantment," tone poem (Victor ©1923) 
 "Bennet's Triumphal March" (Victor 1923/Rubank ©1925; renewed 1952) 
 "Twilight Thoughts," serenade (Victor 1925/Rubank ©1931) 
 "Dainty Maid dancette" (Rubank ©1925)
 "Teamwork," march (Rubank ©1925) 
 "Blue Moon," waltz (Rubank ©1931)
 "Spirit of America" (Rubank)
 "Starter March" (Rubank ©1931)
 "Village Chapel," tone poem (Rubank ©1931)
 "Warming Up," march (Rubank ©1931) 
 "The Street King," march (Rubank ©1937) 
 "Invincible Yank," march (Rubank ©1937) 

Band arrangements published by Victor
 "London Hippodrome," by William Edward Flathers (1867–1940), arranged by Ribble (Victor ©1914) 
 "The World's Military, by William Edward Flathers (1867–1940), arranged by Ribble (Victor ©1914) 
 "Spirit of the West," by Herman August Hummel (aka Harold A. Hummer; 1892–1967), arranged by Ribble (Victor ©1917) 
 "Bull's Triumphal March," by William Edward Flathers (1867–1940), arranged by Ribble (Victor ©1919) 
 "Harmoniana," by John Francis Galuska (1881–1946), arranged by Ribble (Victor ©1923) 
 "Jubilant: Overture," by John Francis Galuska (1881–1946), arranged by Ribble (Victor ©1924) 
 "A Novel Novelette," by Edward S. Chenette (1885–1963), arranged by Ribble (Victor ©1925) 
 "Simplicity," by Ira S. Loos (1867–1926), arranged by Ribble (Victor ©1925) 
 "Slidin' Some," by Edward S. Chenette (1885–1963), band arrangement by Ribble (Victor ©1925, Rubank ©1952)

Band arrangements published by Milton Weil
 "Wherever You Go — Whatever You Do," by Bernie Grossman (né Bernard Leopold Grossman; 1885–1951), Joe Goodwin (né Joseph A. Goodwin; 1889–1943), Larry Shay, & Benny J. Meroff (1901–1973), arranged by Ribble (Milton Weil Music Co. ©1926) 
 "Sweethearts on Parade," by Carmen Lombardo & Charles Newman, arranged by Ribble (Milton Weil Music Co. ©1928) 

Band arrangements published by other publishers
 "Looking at the World Through Rose-Colored Glasses"
 "Dream Train"
 "Highways Are Happy Ways"
 "So Tired," slow march, by George A. Little (1890–1946) & Arthur Sizemore (1891–1954), arranged by Ribble (Harold Rossiter Music Co. ©1927) 

Arrangements for the University of Nebraska Band
 "March of the Cornhuskers," lyrics and music by Ribble and William T. Quick
 "Hail Varsity," lyrics by Joyce Ayres, music by Wilbur Chenoweth, arranged by Ribble
 "Fight Song"

See also 
 Screamer (march)
 American march music

References

American jazz cornetists
1870 births
1964 deaths